Antonio Lardera (born 30 June 1936), better known by his stage name Tony Dallara, is an Italian former singer, actor and television personality.

Biography
Dallara was born in Campobasso in southern Italy, but grew up in Milan. After working as barman and clerk, he began his musical career in the band Rocky Mountains (the future group I Campioni); his singing style was inspired, in particular, by American singers such as Frankie Laine and Tony Williams.  

In 1957, he signed a contract as singer with the Italian label Music, where he was working as delivery man. His first single "Come prima", although refused for admission to the Sanremo Festival, was published in December 1957 and sold 300,000 copies, becoming the biggest selling single in Italy up to that point. 

In 1960 Dallara won the Sanremo Music Festival and the Canzonissima competition with the song "Romantica"; the following year he won again Canzonissima with the song "Bambina bambina".

References 
 

1936 births
Living people
People from Campobasso
Italian male singers
Italian television personalities
Sanremo Music Festival winners